The Nokia 2650 was first made public in the second quarter of 2004. The model was one of Nokia's few clamshell releases at that time, and being an entry-level phone, it became popular largely due to its low price.

Features
The Nokia 2650 has the following features:
 LED light for alerts to sms and incoming calls
 A high resolution 128 x 128 colour display
 Full colour xHTML via GPRS
 Multimedia Messaging
 An enhanced phone book with images added to contacts available
 An enhanced calendar function
 Downloadable Java games and applications, Wallpapers, Polyphonic ringtones

Specification sheet

References 

2650
Mobile phones introduced in 2004